Benton Station may refer to:

Benton Station, Alberta, Canada
Benton Station, an earlier name for Benton, California, United States
Benton Station, Tennessee, an unincorporated community in the United States
Benton Metro station, North Tyneside, England

See also
 Benton (disambiguation)
 Benton City (disambiguation)
 Fort Benton (disambiguation)
 Bentonville (disambiguation)